Tsachik Gelander (צחיק גלנדר) is an Israeli mathematician working in the fields of Lie groups, topological groups, symmetric spaces, lattices and discrete subgroups (of Lie groups as well as general locally compact groups). He is a professor in Northwestern University.

Gelander earned his PhD from the Hebrew University of Jerusalem in 2003, under the supervision of Shahar Mozes. His doctoral dissertation, Counting Manifolds and Tits Alternative, won the Haim Nessyahu Prize in Mathematics, awarded by the Israel Mathematical Union for the best annual doctoral dissertations in mathematics.
He contributed to the theory of lattices, Fuchsian groups and local rigidity, and the work on Chern's conjecture and the Derivation Problem.

In 2018, he was an invited speaker in the International Congress of Mathematicians, giving a talk under the title of Asymptotic Invariants of Locally Symmetric Spaces. 
He was one of the nine European mathematicians awarded the ERC Advanced Grants 2021.

Selected publications

References

Hebrew University of Jerusalem alumni
Israeli mathematicians
Living people
Mathematics journal editors
Year of birth missing (living people)